Konstantin Aleksandrovich Ivanov (born 10 May 1964) is a former Russian football midfielder.

Club career
He played in 6 Soviet Top League seasons for FC Zenit Leningrad, but did not make any appearances for the main squad in 1984 when they won the league.

References

External links
 

1964 births
People from Gatchinsky District
Living people
Soviet footballers
Russian footballers
Association football midfielders
FC Zenit Saint Petersburg players
FC Lokomotiv Saint Petersburg players
Skonto FC players
FC Dynamo Saint Petersburg players
FC Kristall Smolensk players
Soviet Top League players
Latvian Higher League players
Russian expatriate footballers
Expatriate footballers in Latvia
Russian expatriate sportspeople in Latvia
Sportspeople from Leningrad Oblast